Motherless may refer to the state of having only a father (see: single parent, or being an orphan). Other uses include:

 Motherless Brooklyn (novel), a novel by Jonathan Lethem (1999)
 Motherless Brooklyn (film), the 2019 film adaptation by Edward Norton
 "Motherless Children", a blues standard first recorded by Blind Willie Johnson in 1927